Zang Yifeng (born 15 October 1993) is a Chinese professional footballer who currently plays as a midfielder for Shijiazhuang Ever Bright.

Club career
Zang Yifeng joined Hangzhou Greentown youth team system from Shenzhen Yantian Sports School in 2006. Zang started his professional football career in 2011 when he was loaned to Wenzhou Provenza's squad for the 2011 China League Two campaign. He returned to Hangzhou Greentown reserved team squad in 2012 and made his Super League debut on 22 April 2012 against Tianjin Teda. He was promoted to the first team in the summer of 2012. Zang scored his first goal for Hangzhou on 20 July 2014, which ensured Hangzhou beat Changchun Yatai 3–2. Zang was demoted to the reserved team in the 2018 season.

On 22 February 2019, Zang transferred to fellow China League One side Shijiazhuang Ever Bright. In his first season with the club he would help the team to a runners-up position and promotion into the top tier.

Career statistics 
Statistics accurate as of match played 3 January 2022.

References

External links

1993 births
Living people
People from Guiyang
Footballers from Guizhou
Zhejiang Professional F.C. players
Cangzhou Mighty Lions F.C. players
Chinese Super League players
China League One players
China League Two players
Association football midfielders
Chinese footballers